The 1975–76 Connecticut Huskies men's basketball team represented the University of Connecticut in the 1975–76 collegiate men's basketball season. The Huskies completed the season with a 19–10 overall record. The Huskies were members of the Yankee Conference, where they ended the season with a 7–5 record. They were the champions of the postseason ECAC tournament. They made it to the sweet sixteen in the 1976 NCAA Men's Division I Basketball Tournament. The Huskies played their home games at Hugh S. Greer Field House in Storrs, Connecticut and the Hartford Civic Center in Hartford, Connecticut, and were led by seventh-year head coach Dee Rowe.

Schedule 

|-
!colspan=12 style=""| Regular season

|-
!colspan=12 style=""| ECAC tournament

|-
!colspan=12 style=""| NCAA tournament

Schedule Source:

References 

UConn Huskies men's basketball seasons
Connecticut
Connecticut
1975 in sports in Connecticut
1976 in sports in Connecticut